The Panagopoula Tunnel is a tunnel on the Corinth-Patras section of the Olympia Odos motorway. The name comes from the namesake area of Panagopoula. It consists of two separate sections, one which has a length of 4,018 m (Panagopoula 1) used by vehicles travelling from Patras to Athens, and one which has a length of 3,182 m (Panagopoula 2) used by vehicles travelling from the opposite direction, from Athens to Patras.  
Works began in 2008 along with the whole motorway, but they were halted in 2011. They were again resumed in early 2014.

The 4 Km tunnel  is the longest road tunnel of the whole motorway and the third longest in Greece  It was opened to traffic in late February 2017, a month earlier than the rest of the motorway.

References

Achaea
Road tunnels in Greece